Edward A Williams (1911 - date of death unknown), was a South African international lawn bowler.

Bowls career
He won a silver medal in the fours at the 1958 British Empire and Commonwealth Games in Cardiff, with Norman Snowy Walker, Wilfred Randall and Edward Stuart.

Personal life
He was a sales representative by trade.

References

1911 births
Date of death unknown
Bowls players at the 1958 British Empire and Commonwealth Games
South African male bowls players
Commonwealth Games silver medallists for South Africa
Commonwealth Games medallists in lawn bowls
Medallists at the 1958 British Empire and Commonwealth Games